Somebody's Watching Me is the debut studio album by singer-songwriter Rockwell, released in 1984 on Motown. It features the title track (with Michael Jackson on vocals in the chorus), as well as the US top 40 hit "Obscene Phone Caller". However the next two singles, the power ballad "Knife" and a cover of the Beatles' "Taxman" failed to reach the top 40.

Background

After being kicked out of the house by his father, Motown founder Berry Gordy, Kennedy Gordy moved in with Ray Singleton, Gordy's ex-wife.  While living there, the younger Gordy began working on some music. Seeing the youngster's potential, Singleton successfully lobbied to get Kennedy a staff writing job at Jobete.

One night, Singleton overheard Kennedy working on the track, "Somebody's Watching Me" and believed it was a song worthy of recording. When Motown staff producer Curtis Anthony Nolen took an interest in the song, he was hired as the producer on the project. While working on the song in the studio, Kennedy got the idea to get Michael Jackson to sing on the track. Without indicating his plans, Kennedy picked Jackson up and drove him into the studio. Once Jackson was in the studio, Kennedy asked him to record the chorus with him. Jackson agreed.

Once the track was mixed, Singleton could not wait to play it for Berry Gordy, who thought one of the voices sounded familiar, but could not identify it. When Gordy found out it was Michael Jackson, he was elated.

Not wanting the Gordy name to influence the outcome of the song (his half-brother Kerry Gordy, recorded under his own name five years earlier without success), Kennedy decided to use the name Rockwell on the record. The title cut was one of the biggest singles of 1984 and both the album and single were certified Gold. It was easily the most successful record by a Gordy as a recording artist. Rockwell now gained an exalted position among the Gordy offspring.

In mid 2021, the full album was released on iTunes for the first time. A deluxe edition was also released, containing additional extended and instrumental mixes, as well as a new remix of the title track.

Reception

AllMusic's Rick A. Bueche called the record "an impressive debut set with an emphasis on rock instrumentals."

Track listing
"Somebody's Watching Me" (Rockwell) – 4:59
"Obscene Phone Caller" (Rockwell) – 3:29
"Taxman" (George Harrison) – 3:57
"Change Your Ways" (Norman Dozier, Curtis Anthony Nolen, Rockwell) – 4:25
"Runaway" (Dozier, Nolen, Rockwell) – 4:23
"Wasting Away" (Dozier, Nolen, Rockwell) – 3:56
"Knife" (Mitchell Bottler, Norma Helms, Rockwell) – 5:07
"Foreign Country" (Dozier, Nolen, Rockwell) – 6:05

Deluxe Edition Bonus Tracks 
"Somebody’s Watching Me" (John Morales M+M Extended Mix) - 7:06
"Obscene Phone Caller" (12" Version) - 4:33
"Change Your Ways" (12" Version) - 5:53
"Runaway" (12" Version) - 5:36
"Somebody’s Watching Me" (12" Instrumental) - 5:27
"Obscene Phone Caller" (12" Instrumental) - 5:20
"Taxman" (Instrumental) - 3:53
"Change Your Ways" (12" Instrumental) - 5:53
"Wasting Away" (Instrumental) - 3:58
"Foreign Country" (12" Instrumental) - 6:02

Notes
An up-tempo version of "Knife" was released by another Motown artist, Monalisa Young.  She also appears on this album as a background vocalist.

Personnel
Rockwell – lead vocals, keyboards, synthesizers, drums, percussion
Teri DeSario, Norman Dozier, Oma Drake, Marva Holcolm, Jermaine Jackson, Michael Jackson, Lyndie White, Monalisa Young and Terry Young – backing vocals
Nicholas Brown and Thomas J. Parker – electric guitar
Dave Cochran – bass guitar
Norman Dozier, Russell Ferrante, Jim Foeber, Gregg Karukas, Michael Lang, Anthony Santosusso and Randy Waldman – keyboards, synthesizers
Ricky Lawson, Phillip Madayag and Anthony Santosusso – drums, percussion

Production
Producer: Curtis Anthony Nolen for Super Three Productions
Recorded at Mars Recording Studios, Los Angeles, California
Recording engineers: Arne Frager, Joe Q. Hall, Scott Skidmore, Booker T. Jones III
Mixed by Arne Frager, Curtis Anthony Nolen, Rockwell, Joe Q. Hall, Steve Smith
Mastering engineer: John Matousek
Art direction: Johnny Lee
Design: Janet Levinson
Visual consultant: Nancy Leiviska
Executive producer: Ray Singleton

Charts

Weekly charts

Year-end charts

Certifications

References

1984 debut albums
Rockwell (musician) albums
Motown albums